Nikolay Poljakov (born June 14, 1951) is a Soviet sailor. He won the silver medal in  Soling in the 1980 Summer Olympics in Moscow along with Alexandr Budnikov and Boris Budnikov.

References

External links
Profile at ESBL 

1951 births
Living people
Russian male sailors (sport)
Estonian male sailors (sport)
Olympic sailors of the Soviet Union
Olympic silver medalists for the Soviet Union
Soviet male sailors (sport)
Olympic medalists in sailing
Sailors at the 1976 Summer Olympics – Soling
Sailors at the 1980 Summer Olympics – Soling
Sailors at the 1988 Summer Olympics – Soling
Medalists at the 1980 Summer Olympics
European Champions Soling